Rhinitis medicamentosa (or RM) is a condition of rebound nasal congestion suspected to be brought on by extended use of topical decongestants (e.g., oxymetazoline, phenylephrine, xylometazoline, and naphazoline nasal sprays) and certain oral medications (e.g., sympathomimetic amines and various 2-imidazolines) that constrict blood vessels in the lining of the nose, although evidence has been contradictory.

Presentation
The characteristic presentation of RM involves nasal congestion without rhinorrhea, postnasal drip, or sneezing following several days of decongestant use. This condition typically occurs after 5–7 days of use of topical decongestants.  Patients often try increasing both the dose and the frequency of nasal sprays upon the onset of RM, worsening the condition. The swelling of the nasal passages caused by rebound congestion may eventually result in permanent turbinate hypertrophy, which may block nasal breathing until surgically removed.

Causes
Common issues that lead to overuse of topical decongestants:
 Deviated septum
 Upper respiratory tract infection
 Vasomotor rhinitis
 Cocaine use and other stimulant abuse
 Pregnancy (these products are not considered safe for pregnancy)
 Chronic rhinosinusitis
 Hypertrophy of the inferior turbinates

Pathophysiology

The pathophysiology of RM is unclear, although several mechanisms involving norepinephrine signaling have been proposed.  RM is associated with histological changes that include: an increase in the number of lymphocytes and fibroblasts, epithelial cell denudation, epithelial edema, goblet cell hyperplasia, increased expression of the epidermal growth factor receptor, increased mucus production, nasociliary loss, inflammatory cell infiltration, and squamous cell metaplasia.

Direct acting sympathomimetic amines, such as phenylephrine stimulate alpha adrenergic receptors, while mixed-acting agents, such as pseudoephedrine can stimulate both alpha and beta adrenergic receptors directly and indirectly by releasing norepinephrine from sympathetic nerve terminals.  At first, the vasoconstrictive effect of alpha-receptors dominates, but with continued use of an alpha agonist, this effect fades first, allowing the vasodilation due to beta-receptor stimulation to emerge.

2-Imidazoline derivatives, such as oxymetazoline, may participate in negative feedback on endogenous norepinephrine production.  Therefore, after cessation of prolonged use, there will be inadequate sympathetic vasoconstriction in the nasal mucosa, and domination of parasympathetic activity can result in increased secretions and nasal edema. Evidence suggests that if oxymetazoline is used only nightly for allergic rhinitis (instead of more frequent dosage as may be directed on product label), it may be used longer than one week without high risk of rhinitis medicamentosa especially with use of intranasal steroid like fluticasone furoate.

Treatment
The treatment of RM involves withdrawal of the offending nasal spray or oral medication. Both a "cold turkey" and a "weaning" approach can be used. Cold turkey is the most effective treatment method, as it directly removes the cause of the condition, yet the time period between the discontinuation of the drug and the relief of symptoms may be too long and uncomfortable for some individuals (particularly when trying to go to sleep when they are unable to breathe through their nose).

The use of over-the-counter (OTC) saline nasal sprays may help open the nose without causing RM if the spray does not contain a decongestant. Symptoms of congestion and runny nose can often be treated with corticosteroid nasal sprays under the supervision of a physician. For very severe cases, oral steroids or nasal surgery may be necessary.

For RM caused by topical decongestants, there are anecdotal reports of persons having success by withdrawing treatment from one nostril at a time.

A study has shown that the anti-infective agent benzalkonium chloride, which is frequently added to topical nasal sprays as a preservative, aggravates the condition by further increasing the rebound swelling.

See also
 Topical decongestant

References

Further reading

External links 

Nose disorders